Chelveston is a small village in North Northamptonshire. To the south is the hamlet of Caldecott and the settlement of Chelston Rise which together comprise the civil parish of Chelveston cum Caldecott. The population is now included in the civil parish of Chelveston cum Caldecott.

History
The villages name means 'Ceolwulfs farm/settlement'.

The last lords of the manor of Chelveston were the Disbrowe family, and the last lord, Lt. Col. Henry Edward Disbrowe Disbrowe-Wise CBE, who had inherited the title from his mother, sold off the last of the family's estate properties in Chelveston at auction in July 1919. Disbrowe-Wise moved to other family properties in South Derbyshire. The parish church is dedicated to St John the Baptist and is mostly 13th century. The north arcade is 1849-50 by Edmund Francis Law, a Northampton architect.

Village Hall
Formerly the village's two room school with adjacent schoolmasters house, the school was closed in 1967 and was re-opened in 1972 as the Village Hall.  In 2014 it was refurbished and extended with new toilets, shower and kitchen facilities.

Heritage assets

The following buildings and structures are listed by Historic England as of special architectural or historic interest.

Poplar Farmhouse (Grade II) 17th century 
Manor Farmhouse (Grade II) 18th century 
Manor Farmhouse, Barn (Grade II) 18th century 
Duchy Farmhouse (Grade II) 17th century 
Church of St John The Baptist (Grade II*) 13th century 
The Cottage (Grade II) 18th century

RAF Chelveston

Nearby is the former airfield of RAF Chelveston.  A new memorial to the 305th Bombardment Group (Heavy) who operated out of the airfield, was unveiled in the centre of the village on 26 May 2007.

Demography

In 1801 there were 266 persons
In 1831 there were 332 persons
In 1841 there were 288 persons
In 2011 there were 566 persons

Chelston Rise
Beyond Caldecott is a settlement of 50 houses which were formerly used by the US Air Force to house families working at nearby bases. The site is now owned by Area Estates Ltd. Some of the houses have been privately rented out and others sold privately. This community has been renamed Chelston Rise (from the old name for Chelveston).

Nearby Settlements
Ringstead, Keyston, Stanwick, Rushden, Higham Ferrers, Thrapston, Hargrave, Irthlingborough, Newton Bromswold, Raunds, Wellingborough

References

External links

Chelveston-cum-Caldecott Parish Council website

Villages in Northamptonshire
North Northamptonshire